André Vorraber Costa (born 21 August 1976) is a Brazilian rower. He competed in the men's quadruple sculls event at the 1996 Summer Olympics.

References

External links
 

1976 births
Living people
Brazilian male rowers
Olympic rowers of Brazil
Rowers at the 1996 Summer Olympics
Sportspeople from Porto Alegre